Frantz Gilles (born 1 November 1977) is a Haitian former professional footballer who played as a defender for Cavaly AS and Zénith in the Ligue Haïtienne.

Club career
Gilles spent almost his entire career for his hometown club Cavaly, except for a short spell at Zénith FC in Cap-Haïtien.

International career
A mainstay of the national teams for almost ten years, Gilles made his debut for Haiti in a June 1999 friendly match against Trinidad and Tobago. He was a Haiti squad member at the 2002 and 2007 Gold Cup Finals and he played in 12 World Cup qualification matches in 2000 and 2004.

Honours
Haiti
 Caribbean Nations Cup: 2007

References

External links
 

1977 births
Living people
Haitian footballers
Association football defenders
Haiti international footballers
2002 CONCACAF Gold Cup players
2007 CONCACAF Gold Cup players
2009 CONCACAF Gold Cup players
Ligue Haïtienne players
Cavaly AS players
Zénith FC players
People from Ouest (department)